The Demographic and Health Surveys (DHS) Program is responsible for collecting and disseminating accurate, nationally representative data on health and population in developing countries. The project is implemented by ICF International and is funded by the United States Agency for International Development (USAID) with contributions from other donors such as UNICEF, UNFPA, WHO, and UNAIDS.

The DHS is highly comparable to the Multiple Indicator Cluster Surveys and the technical teams developing and supporting the surveys are in close collaboration. 

Since September 2013, ICF International has been partnering with seven internationally experienced organizations to expand access to and use of the DHS data: Johns Hopkins Bloomberg School of Public Health Center for Communication Programs; Program for Appropriate Technology in Health (PATH); Avenir Health; Vysnova; Blue Raster; Kimetrica; and EnCompass.

Overview
Since 1984, The Demographic and Health Surveys (DHS) Program has provided technical assistance to more than 300 demographic and health surveys in over 90 countries. DHS surveys collect information on fertility and total fertility rate (TFR), reproductive health, maternal health, child health, immunization and survival, HIV/AIDS; maternal mortality, child mortality, malaria, and nutrition among women and children stunted. The strategic objective of The DHS Program is to improve and institutionalize the collection and use of data by host countries for program monitoring and evaluation and for policy development decisions.

Surveys
The DHS Program supports the following data collection options:
 
 Demographic and Health Surveys (DHS): provide data for monitoring and impact evaluation indicators in the areas of population, health, and nutrition.
 AIDS Indicator Surveys (AIS): provide countries with a standardized tool to obtain indicators for the effective monitoring of national HIV/AIDS programs.
 Service Provision Assessment (SPA) Surveys: provide information about the characteristics of health and family planning services available in a country.
 Malaria Indicators Surveys (MIS): Provide data on bednet ownership and use, prevention of malaria during pregnancy, and prompt and effective treatment of fever in young children. In some cases, biomarker testing for malaria and anemia are also included.
 Key Indicators Survey (KIS): provide monitoring and evaluation data for population and health activities in small areas—regions, districts, catchment areas—that may be targeted by an individual project, although they can be used in nationally representative surveys as well.
 Other Quantitative Data: include Geographic Data Collection, and Benchmarking Surveys.
 Biomarker Collection: in conjunction with surveys, more than 2 million tests have been conducted for HIV, anemia, malaria, and more than 25 other biomarkers.
 Qualitative Research: provides information outside the purview of standard quantitative approaches.

Data
The DHS Program works to provide survey data for program managers, health care providers, policymakers, country leaders, researchers, members of the media, and others who can act to improve public health. The DHS Program distributes unrestricted survey data files for legitimate academic research at no cost.

Online databases include: STATcompiler, STATmapper, HIV/AIDS Survey Indicators Database, HIV Spatial Data Repository, HIVmapper, and Country QuickStats.

Publications
The DHS Program produces publications that provide country specific and comparative data on population, health, and nutrition in developing countries. Most publications are available online for download, but if an electronic version of the publication is not available, a hard copy may be available.

Countries
The DHS Program has been active in over 90 countries in Africa, Asia, Central Asia; West Asia; and Southeast Asia, Latin America and the Caribbean. A list of the publications for each country is available online at The DHS Program web site.

Special Focus Topics

HIV/AIDS
Since 2001, The DHS Program has worked in over 15 countries in Africa, Asia and Latin America and Caribbean conducting population-based HIV testing. By collecting blood for HIV testing from representative samples of the population of men and women in a country, the DHS Program provides nationally representative estimates of HIV rates. The testing protocol provides for anonymous, informed, and voluntary testing of women and men.

The program also collects data on internationally recognized AIDS indicators. Currently, the main sources of HIV/AIDS indicators in the database are the Demographic and Health Surveys (DHS), the Multiple Indicator Cluster Surveys (MICS), the Reproductive Health Surveys (RHS), the Sexual Behavior Surveys (SBS), and Behavioral Surveillance Surveys (BSS). Eventually it will cover all countries for which indicators are available. The project also collects data on the capacity of health care facilities to deliver HIV prevention and treatment services.

Malaria
Since 2000, DHS (and some AIS) surveys have collected data on ownership and use of mosquito nets, treatment of fever in children, and intermittent preventive treatment of pregnant women. In recent years, additional questions on indoor residual spraying, and biomarker testing for anemia and malaria have been conducted. This has however not changed the trend in malaria infections thereby calling for more interventions by researchers and scientists.

Gender
The DHS Program researches and trains for integrating gender into population, health and nutrition programs and HIV/AIDS-related activities in the developing world.

Questions on gender roles and empowerment are integrated into most DHS questionnaires. For countries interested in more in-depth data on gender, modules of questions are available on specific topics such as status of women, domestic violence, and female genital mutilation.

Youth
The DHS Program has interviewed thousands of young people and gathered information about their education, employment, media exposure, nutrition, sexual activity, fertility, unions, and general reproductive health, including HIV prevalence. 
The Youth Corner on the DHS website presents findings about youth and features profiles of young adults ages 15–24 from more than 30 countries worldwide. The Youth Corner is part of the broader effort by the Interagency Youth Working Group (IYWG) to help program managers, donors, national and local governments, teachers, religious leaders, and nongovernmental organizations (NGOs) plan and implement programs to improve the reproductive health of young adults.

Geographic information
The DHS Program now analyzes the impact of geographic location using DHS data and geographic information systems (GIS). The DHS Program routinely collects geographic information in all surveyed countries. Using GIS, researchers can link DHS data with routine health data, health facility locations, local infrastructure such as roads and rivers, and environmental conditions.

Biomarkers
Using field-friendly technologies, the DHS Program is able to collect biomarker data relating to conditions and infections. DHS surveys have tested for anemia (by measuring hemoglobin), HIV infection, sexually transmitted diseases such as syphilis and the herpes simplex virus, serum retinol (Vitamin A), lead exposure, high blood pressure, and immunity from vaccine-preventable diseases like measles and tetanus. Traditionally, much of the data gathered in DHS surveys is self-reported. Biomarkers complement this information by providing an objective profile of a specific disease or health condition in a population. Biomarker data contributes to the understanding of behavioral risk factors and determinants of different illnesses.

See also

 National Survey of Family Growth
 PMA2020 Family Planning and WASH surveys
 Multiple Indicator Cluster Survey (MICS)
 Living Standards Measurement Study (LSMS)

References

External links 
 Official website
 STATcompiler

Health informatics
Bioinformatics
Health surveys
Social statistics data
United States Agency for International Development
1984 establishments